In chemistry, alpha elimination refers to particular types of elimination reactions.  The definition of alpha elimination differs for organometallic and organic chemistry.

Organic chemistry
In organic chemistry, alpha-elimination refers to reactions of this type:
R2CHX  →  R2C:  +  HX
The reaction is employed to generate carbenes and nitrenes. The formation of dichlorocarbene from chloroform is an example.

Alpha eliminations contrasts with beta eliminations, which are commonly used to generate alkenes:
R2CHCXR'2  →  R2C=CR'2  +  HX
Both alpha- and beta-eliminations typically require strong base.

Organometallic chemistry
In organometallic chemistry, alpha elimination refers to reactions of this type (other spectator ligands omitted):
X-M-CH2R  →  M=CHR  +  HX
Well studied case are found in organotantalum chemistrys leading to an alkylidene derivatives.  Specifically, tetraalkyl-monochloro-tantalum complex undergoes α-hydrogen elimination, followed by alkylation of the remaining chloride to give a derivative with a Ta=C bond.               

Alpha elimination contrasts with β-hydride elimination, whereby an alkyl group bonded to a metal centre is converted into the corresponding metal-bonded hydride and an alkene. 

Both α- and β-eliminations proceed via agostic intermediates.

See also
 Elimination reaction, mainly focused on organic substrates.

References

Organometallic chemistry
Transition metals